Pukarani (Aymara pukara fortress, -ni a suffix, "the one with a fortress", also spelled Pucarani) is a  mountain in the Bolivian Andes. It is located in the Cochabamba Department, Ayopaya Province, Morochata Municipality. It lies northeast of the village of Pukarani (Pucarani).

References 

Mountains of Cochabamba Department